Lepiota lilacea is a species of fungus belonging to the family Agaricaceae.

It is native to Europe and  America.

References

lilacea